Volunteer Park may refer to:

Volunteer Park, Armadale, a football ground in Armadale, Scotland
Volunteer Park (Seattle), a park in the Capitol Hill neighborhood of Seattle, Washington State, USA
Volunteer Park Conservatory, a conservatory/belvedere/glass walled summer house type structure in the Seattle park
Volunteer Park Family Campground, a Recreation Vehicle (RV) park in Heiskell, Tennessee, USA